"Get Wild" is a song by The New Power Generation (1994), the backing band of musician Prince

Get Wild may also refer to:
 "Get Wild" (Aaron Carter song), from the album Aaron Carter, 1997
 Get Wild (album), by Iranian-American DJ Sharam, 2009
 Get Wild (EP), by Max M, 1992
 "Get Wild", a track from the EP
 "Get Wild", a song by the Japanese band TM Network, first ending theme of City Hunter anime series, 1987